The 1996 Pilot Pen International was a men's tennis tournament played on outdoor hard courts at the Cullman-Heyman Tennis Center in New Haven, Connecticut in the United States and was part of the Championship Series of the 1996 ATP Tour. It was the 24th edition of the tournament and ran from August 12 through August 18, 1996. Unseeded Alex O'Brien, who entered the draw on a wildcard, won the singles title.

Finals

Singles

 Alex O'Brien defeated  Jan Siemerink 7–6(8–6), 6–4
 It was O'Brien's 1st title of the year and the 2nd of his career.

Doubles

 Byron Black /  Grant Connell defeated  Jonas Björkman /  Nicklas Kulti 6–4, 6–4
 It was Black's 5th title of the year and the 16th of his career. It was Connell's 4th title of the year and the 21st of his career.

References

External links
 ITF – tournament edition details

 
Pilot Pen International
Pilot Pen International
Pilot Pen International
Volvo International